Me Stallarit  ("We Stalinists") was a Finnish TV comedy series by Matti Kinnunen and Roope Lehtinen. The series ran from September 7, 2004 to November 23, 2004 (Total 12 episodes). The series aired on MTV3 with tagline: "Tervetuloa aikaan, joka ei koskaan palaa. Onneksi." ("Welcome to an era which will never return. Fortunately.")

Me Stallarit is a series about a far-left-wing family living in Merihaka, Helsinki in the 70's.

Finnish comedy television series